Apostolos Apostolopoulos (born 11 December 2002) is a Greek professional footballer who plays as a left-back for Super League 2 club Olympiacos B.

Career statistics

Club

Notes

References

2002 births
Living people
Greek footballers
Super League Greece 2 players
Gamma Ethniki players
Association football defenders
Panserraikos F.C. players
Olympiacos F.C. players
Footballers from Serres
Olympiacos F.C. B players